Lucilla singleyana is a species of minute air-breathing land snail, a terrestrial pulmonate gastropod mollusc or micromollusk in the family Helicodiscidae. 

The shell of this species is about 2 mm in width.

Original description 
Lucilla singleyana was originally discovered and described (under the name Zonites singleyanus) by Henry Augustus Pilsbry in 1889.

Pilsbry's original text (the type description) reads as follows:

Distribution
This species is Holarctic in distribution.

The indigenous distribution for this species includes North America.

Then non-indigenous distribution areas include:
 France
 Great Britain
 Poland
 Slovakia
 Ukraine

This species was previously announced from the Czech Republic since 1988, but later in 2009 was all findings recognized as Lucilla scintilla.

This species has been introduced to New Zealand.

Ecology
This species lives in soil, see soil-inhabitant. Technically this is known as being a terricol species.

References
This article incorporates public domain text from the reference.

Helicodiscidae
Gastropods described in 1889